The murder of Helena Jubany Lorente (Mataró, 27 February 1974, Sabadell – 2 December 2001) was a murder committed against a 27-year-old librarian who was found dead in Sabadell on 2 December 2001 after being thrown off a terrace into an inner courtyard, stripped naked and with several burns on her body.

The case was dismissed and the trial did not take place. The circumstances, motive or material perpetrators of the murder were never completely clear. The proceedings were marred by irregularities and the only person charged with the acts never admitted responsibility and committed suicide while in prison. On 23 March 2020, TV3’s  programme CRIMS broadcast a double feature on this case.

Context 
Helena Jubany was a journalist, librarian and writer from Mataró who was integrated into the cultural and social activity of the region. She began her professional career as an intern for El Punt in Maresme, for the local TV and at the Robafaves local bookshop. From 2000 she worked as a librarian in Sentmenat, where she was in charge of the children's section. As a result of this new job, she moved to a flat and lived alone in Sabadell. From then, she began to collaborate with the Nature Section of Unió Excursionista de Sabadell, a local hiking association.

On 17 September 2001, Helena found a bottle of horchata with some small cakes on her doorstep with a hand-written note. The note said:

The fact that it was horchata was not strange at all because it was her favorite drink, so the author of the note had to knew this. It's known Helena drank it.

Some days later, on 9 October, she found a new gift on her doorstep. This time, a drink of Granini peach juice, accompanied by a second note which indicated that she should accept the gift with good humour, and that soon the mystery would be revealed. The note said:

This time Jubany tasted the juice, but in doing so she found it strange and didn't finish it. Intrigued, she commissioned an analysis in a laboratory in Sabadell, where the juice was found to contain benzodiazepine, a type of somniferous drug.

Murder 
Helena Jubany left home at noon on Friday 30 November after working with the computer, but she didn't arrive  at the Sentmenat Library, where she worked. According to the investigation, on that day she received a telephone call in the morning, and at noon, she reportedly left the house and drove to 48 Calvet de Estrella Street in Sabadell. There, in the apartment of two acquaintances of hers, Montse Careta, a teacher, and Santi Laiglesia, a criminal lawyer, someone drugged her, left her unconscious and retained her. A situation that would last all Saturday, according to the investigations, elaborated by two forensic scientists, who explained that it takes many hours until the body removes a substance like benzodiazepine in the urine.

Later, while still alive, she was taken to the roof of the same building, and from there she was thrown off between three and five o'clock in the morning of 2 December, with a somniferous dose 35 times higher than normal, but not enough to cause death. She died at the age of 27 after being thrown off the terrace and the subsequent impact on the ground. The autopsy confirmed that when she was thrown, the victim was in a semi-coma.

The body fell, crashing through the clotheslines, into the back yard of an adjacent building at 91-97 Guell i Ferrer Street. A neighbour found the body at 9 o'clock in the morning of the same day, stripped naked, and with burns on several parts of the body. The head was disfigured as a result of the impact on the ground, which made immediate identification impossible.

Investigation 
On Saturday 1 December Helena had arranged to have lunch with her father, Joan Jubany (Mataró, 1945). When he saw that she did not appear, he decided to call her but there was no answer.  On Sunday she had arranged to meet a friend but she didn't appear either. Her father, worried, went to her flat in Sabadell but couldn't find her. Being on Sunday, he waited until Monday to call her work, where he was informed that she had not been to work on the previous Friday. After this, the victim's father reported her missing. After the report the police were able to identify the body which they had found some days before.

The case was taken by Judge Manuel Horacio García, of the Tribunal de Instrucción No 3 in Sabadell. The first police investigations indicated that the victim "fell" from the communal terrace of the property at 48 Calvet de Estrella Street, where the victim's hair was found and Jubany's clothes were also found on the terrace. The burns were presumably caused before falling into the yard located at the confluence of Calvet de Estrella and Guell i Ferrer. A whitish substance was also found in her vagina, but the investigation did not clarify what it was.

Her death caused a strong impact in Mataró, where the victim was well known in cultural circles. The first interrogations of family members, workmates, neighbours and friends allowed the police to determine that there was one person who had a connection to the place where the body was found and Helena Jubany herself. It was Montserrat Careta i Herrera, who lived on Calvet de Estrella street, specifically in the building which had the terrace from which the victim was allegedly thrown. The investigations then determined a triangle in which Montserrat Careta, Santi Laiglesia, a criminal lawyer and Careta's sentimental partner, and Ana Echaguivel Rad who were all connected to the hiking association Unió Excursionista de Sabadell.

It was also indicated that the handwritten notes may have been written by Montserrat Careta, and part of the second written note by the other defendant Ana Echaguivel. None of the defendants could justify where they were on the night of the events, nor why they had not gone to work on the morning of 3 December. Both Careta and Laiglesia participated in a trip with the Sabadell Hiking Group on 2 December, although they were not previously registered.

Arrest and suicide 
On 12 February 2002, Montserrat Careta was arrested as the alleged perpetrator of the crime. She was detained on remand at Wad-Ras prison in Barcelona. In her flat two pots of Noctamid, a psychopharmacological drug with hypnotic effects that contains Benzodiapezine, the same substance found in the body of the victim, were found. The national police also located a box of matches such as those found on the roof and which were allegedly used to burn Helena. During her time in prison, Careta always defended her innocence through letters she sent to family and friends.

While Careta was in jail, the judge began to indict Santiago Laiglesia and Ana Echaguivel. On 23 March, he arrested Echaguivel, then 32 years old and a neighbour of Sabadell, when a calligraphy test determined that she was the author of the first half of the second anonymous letter that Jubany had received in the weeks before her death.

On 7 May 2002, Montserrat Careta was found dead hanging in the bathroom of her cell in Barcelona's Wad-Ras prison, according to her lawyer, Joaquim Escudé. She left a note in which she claimed that she was innocent of the murder attributed to her. She had a nylon cord tied around her neck. Ana Echaguivel, also in pre-trial detention, was released on charges a few days later, in June 2002.

The secret of the summary proceedings was lifted in the autumn of 2002, and Helena Jubany's relatives held a press conference on 3 October, where family lawyer Pep Manté reported a possible hypothesis of the murder attributable to a "role playing game". The legal representative of the family argued that under no circumstances did the young woman suspect that she was part of a macabre game that would lead to her death. He claimed that Jubany had commented that she had received anonymous notes, but was not afraid, only intrigued and curious.

The investigation remained open to determine the events that occurred between noon on 30 November and 9am on 2 December, when the body was found. He also mentioned that Santi Laiglesia, who could be considered the co-author in the murder of the girl, did not appear in any of the almost 1,000 pages of the investigation. Laiglesia's lawyer, Joaquim Escuder, declared: "See? We will never really know what happened"

Closing the case 
The case was finally closed in October 2005, when the judge considered that the "solidity of the evidence" was not "sufficient" to sustain the accusation, against Careta's sentimental companion, Santiago Laiglesia Pla, or Ana Echaguivel, both members of the UES.

In 2017, two journalism students, Anna Prats and Iago García, tried to gather all the information so that the facts could be clarified. Both the families of the victim as well as Montserrat Careta consider that the perpetrator or perpetrators of the murder "remain free". Careta's relatives point out that Laiglesia, a lawyer and criminologist, almost always slept in the same building as the events and, according to the Careta family, had the keys to the flat. In addition, according to the family, the box of matches and Noctamid were perfectly positioned to draw quick and easy conclusions two months after the event. Also the results of the first calligraphy test were discarded after later studies.

Request for reopening the case 
The relatives of Jubany and Careta demanded the reopening of the case, arguing irregularities in the investigation. They wonder why they didn't take fingerprints from Helena's car, the flat or the terrace, and why the police waited for hours before searching Montse Careta's flat when she was arrested. They also argue that the evidence seemed "prepared", because if Montse Careta had actually administered the drugs to Jubany and burned her, she would not have left the incriminating evidence at home for more than two months.

Another argument they add is that even if  Careta were guilty, her small stature would not have allowed her to commit the crime alone, since, as detailed in the investigation, she wouldn't have had the strength to carry Helena Jubany's unconscious body up the stairs. She lived on the third floor and would have had to carry the body to the roof, located on the fourth floor of a building without a lift. Nor would she have had the strength, once there, to lift her up and then throw her off the terrace. A language study was published in December 2018, ruling out the fact that the anonymous letters had been written by Montse Careta. In fact, a national police officer strongly believes that the killer is Santiago Laiglesia.

The perpetrator and motive of the crime are still to be solved, and in 2025 the crime will become unprosecutable in accordance with the law.

Legacy 
In 2007 the Helena Jubany Cultural Association was created to keep her memory alive. An annual literary prize for short narratives or a collection of stories is held each year in the capital of Maresme.

References

External links 

 El Crim de l'Helena Jubany
 Associació Cultural Helena Jubany - Biografia

2001 in Catalonia
2001 murders in Spain
Murder in Catalonia
Female murder victims
Sabadell
Incidents of violence against women
Violence against women in Spain